= Los Balverdi =

Coordinates: 28.2731°S 67.1131°W

- Municipality and village
- Interactive map of Los Balverdi
- Country: Argentina
- Province: Catamarca Province
- Time zone: UTC−3 (ART)

Los Balverdi is a village and municipality in Catamarca Province in northwestern Argentina.
